Bourbon may refer to:

Food and drink 
 Bourbon whiskey, an American whiskey made using a corn-based mash
 Bourbon barrel aged beer, a type of beer aged in bourbon barrels
 Bourbon biscuit, a chocolate sandwich biscuit
 A beer produced by Brasseries de Bourbon
 Bourbon chicken, a dish made with bourbon whiskey
 Bourbon coffee, a type of coffee made from a cultivar of Coffea arabica
 Bourbon Coffee, a coffeehouse chain
 Bourbon vanilla, a cultivar of vanilla

Places 
 Bourbon, Indiana, United States
 Bourbon, Missouri, United States
 Bourbon, Boone County, Missouri
 Bourbon County, Kentucky, United States
 Bourbon County, Kansas, United States
 Bourbon Street, a street in New Orleans, Louisiana, United States
 Bourbon-l'Archambault, Allier département, France
 Bourbon-Lancy, Saône-et-Loire département, France
 Bourbonne-les-Bains, Haute-Marne département, France
 Bourbonnais, an area derived from the former dukedom of Bourbon, France
 Île Bourbon, former name for the Island of Réunion

Politics and history 
 House of Bourbon, French and Spanish royal dynasties
 Spanish royal family
 Duke of Bourbon, a title in the peerage of France
 Bourbon Reforms, a series of measures taken by the Spanish Crown
 Bourbon Restoration (disambiguation), the return to monarchs in the Bourbon Dynasty in France and Spain
 Bourbon Democrat, from 1876 to 1904 a conservative member of the US Democratic Party

Other uses 
 USS Bourbon, a frigate
 Bourbon virus, a tick-borne virus discovered in the summer of 2014
 Bourbon (horse) (foaled in 1774), a British Thoroughbred racehorse
 "Bourbon", a 2019 song by Chad Brownlee from Back in the Game

See also 
 Barbon, a village in Cumbria, England
 Bhurban, a small town and a hill station in Punjab province, Pakistan
 Bourbonism (disambiguation)
 Borbon (disambiguation)
 Constable de Bourbon (disambiguation)
 Bourbon Kid, a supernatural horror book series by an anonymous British author